Ring of Fire is a  progressive syndicated American talk radio program hosted by Mike Papantonio, Sam Seder, and Farron Cousins. The three hosts focus on "exposing Wall Street thugs, environmental criminality, corporate media failure, and political back stories that you will rarely find from any other source".  The show has been on the air since 2004 and is currently aired on Forty-three radio stations across the United States.

J Michael Papantonio is an attorney specializing in mass torts litigation and is senior partner at the Levin Papantonio Law Firm. Seder is an actor, comedian, director and political commentator who hosts The Majority Report, originally on Air America Radio with Janeane Garofalo and currently as an independently produced podcast. In 2013, the show expanded into a television program airing weeknights on topics such as Free Speech TV, hosted by Papantonio and Cousins.

Production 
Producer - Scott Millican

Ring of Fire airs Saturdays from 3PM – 6PM ET. Papantonio does the show from the Pensacola studio while Seder's studio is near The New York Times Building in New York City. The program's theme song is "Ring of Fire," originally by Johnny Cash, is performed by Social Distortion.

History
Facility space was allocated in December 2003  and Ring of Fire aired its first broadcast on May 1, 2004 on the newly founded Air America radio network. It remained there until the network closed almost six years later. Dial Global then picked up the program and has syndicated it since. The radio program was featured in the 2006 documentary film Jesus Camp.

David Bender, who hosted another Air America program, Politically Direct, first appeared on the show when Air America 2.0 was launched in May 2007. Bender returned to the program as a full-time host after the network closed down, but announced on December 11, 2010, that he was again stepping away from the program; Seder announced on The Majority Report podcast December 17, 2010 that he would be Bender's replacement.

The Ring of Fire Network
In 2015, the show became officially known as The Ring of Fire Network, and began focusing heavily on Progressive political content.  Numerous hosts now appear on the show, including Papantonio, Thom Hartmann, Ed Schultz, Abby Martin, Laura Flanders, Sam Seder, David Pakman, Lee Camp, and Mike Malloy. Many of the network's personalities are also veteran personalities for other networks, including Free Speech TV, RT and TeleSUR. Also in 2015, the show began a separate site called Drug Safety News for the "specific purpose of highlighting political maneuvers the pharmaceutical industry is taking to influence government decisions, and to expose the dangers and lack of effectiveness of many of the products the industry is marketing."

References

External links

Air America (radio network)
American talk radio programs
Progressive talk radio
Radio programs on XM Satellite Radio